The Hope Force  (Force Espoir) is a political party of Benin led by Antoine Dayori. 
In the presidential election held on 5 March 2006, the party won 1.25% of the votes for its candidate, Antoine Dayori. In the parliamentary election held on 31 March 2007, the party won two out of 83 seats.

References

Political parties in Benin
Political parties with year of establishment missing